Simon Schoch (born 7 October 1978) is a Swiss snowboarder. At the 2003 World Championships, Schoch won Silver in Parallel Giant Slalom and Bronze in Parallel Slalom. At the 2006 Winter Olympics, he faced his brother Philipp Schoch – the reigning Olympic champion –  in the Parallel Giant Slalom Final. He gave away a 0.88 second deficit in the first run and was unable to make it up in the second leg, ending up with a silver medal.

References 
 Website of Philipp and Simon Schoch

Swiss male snowboarders
Olympic snowboarders of Switzerland
Snowboarders at the 2002 Winter Olympics
Snowboarders at the 2006 Winter Olympics
Snowboarders at the 2010 Winter Olympics
Snowboarders at the 2014 Winter Olympics
1978 births
Living people
Olympic silver medalists for Switzerland
Olympic medalists in snowboarding
Medalists at the 2006 Winter Olympics
21st-century Swiss people